Plagiochasma is an extinct echinoderm genus in the family Pygaulidae.

Species includes:
 Plagiochasma cruciferum (Morton, 1830); Paleocene of Denmark, Belgium, The Netherlands, Trinidad and the United States
 Plagiochasma faringdonense (Wright, 1875); Lower Greensand, Upper Aptian, Early Cretaceous of UK
 Plagiochasma olfersii (L. Agassiz, 1836); Hauterivian, Early Cretaceous of France and Switzerland
 Plagiochasma saurai Forner i Valls, 2016; Barremian, Early Cretaceous of Spain
 Plagiochasma texanum Smith & Rader, 2009; Lower Albian, Texas, USA

See also 
 List of prehistoric echinoderms
 List of prehistoric echinoids

References 

Prehistoric echinoderm genera
Prehistoric life of Europe
Fossils of Greenland